Bicuco (also spelled, Bikuko) is a traditional Filipino ethnic weapon in the province of Tarlac, Pangasinan and La Union. It has a sharp edge blade made of high carbon steel with the edge and its long false edge sharpened with a polished wood grip. It is a long knife intended as working knife used primarily for slaughtering livestock animals and preparing meat. As a weapon, this long knife doubles as a self defense knife that can cut a body quite handily.

References

Arnis
Weapons of the Philippines
Weapons of the Philippine Army
Malayan swords
Blade weapons